The 2010–11 Arizona State Sun Devils men's basketball team represented Arizona State University during the 2010–11 NCAA Division I men's basketball season. The head coach was Herb Sendek. The Sun Devils played their home games at the Wells Fargo Arena and are members of the Pacific-10 Conference. The Sun Devils finished with 12–19, 4–14 in Pac-10 play and lost the first round of the 2011 Pacific-10 Conference men's basketball tournament to Oregon.

Roster

Schedule

|-
!colspan=9 style=|Regular season

|-
!colspan=9 style=}| Pac-10 tournament

References

Arizona State Sun Devils men's basketball seasons
Arizona State Sun Devils
Arizonia
Arizonia